Mount Torbert is the highest point of the Tordrillo Mountains, a small, primarily  volcanic range, northwest of Anchorage, Alaska. It is a heavily glaciated peak, and is not itself a volcano, although nearby Mount Spurr and Crater Peak are active volcanoes.


See also

List of mountain peaks of North America
List of mountain peaks of the United States
List of mountain peaks of Alaska
List of Ultras of the United States

References

Sources
 Alaska Ultra-Prominence Page
 Alaska Volcano Observatory

External links

 Mount Torbert on Topozone
 Mount Torbert on bivouac.com

Mountains of Kenai Peninsula Borough, Alaska
Torbert, Mount